The Grand Prix Super Series of men's tennis tournaments was part of the Grand Prix and World Championship Tennis tours between 1970 and 1989. They were held annually throughout the year in Europe, North America, Africa and Asia. These tournaments were the most prestigious and highest level events of the Grand Prix Tour after the majors and year-end championships. They had six name changes from 1970 through to 1977: Group One, Group B, Group A, Group AA, 5 Star and 6 Star, before settling on a consistent naming format called "Super Series" from 1978 until 1989.

When the Association of Tennis Professionals (ATP) became the sole governing body of men's tennis in 1990, all of the surviving tournaments of the Grand Prix were absorbed into the new ATP Tour. The nine top events existing at that time are now known as ATP Tour Masters 1000 tournaments.

History
The Grand Prix tennis circuit was conceived from idea put forward by former World No. 1 player Jack Kramer, turned promoter in 1968. He proposed "a series of tournaments with a money bonus pool that would be split up on the basis of a cumulative point system." and to "encourage players to compete regularly in the series and qualify for a special championship tournament at the end of the tour season". This system formed the basis of the men's professional game. The WCT founded by Lamar Hunt and David Dixon (1968) was merged into the Grand Prix Tour in 1978. The WCT withdrew from 1982 to 1984, and sued the Men's Tennis Council who organized the men's tennis tour. A settlement resulted in WCT's reincorporation into the Grand Prix in 1985. After the Majors and Year-end Championships, these events were the highest in-terms of status at the time. Throughout the 20-year period from 1970 to 1989 a number of these tournaments ceased to be top-tier tennis events.

Tournament final

1970 Grand Prix – Group 1
The 1970 Grand Prix circuit was the inaugural edition of the Grand Prix circuit and consisted of 20 tournaments which were held from April through December. The tournaments were graded in one of three categories which determined the number of ranking points available: Group A, comprising three Grand Slam tournaments, Grand Prix Masters, Group 1, comprising six tournaments and Group 2. These are Group 1 tournaments:

1971 Grand Prix – Group B
The 1971 Grand Prix circuit was the second edition of the Grand Prix circuit and consisted of 31 tournaments which were held from April through December. The tournaments were graded in one of five categories which determined the number of ranking points available: Group A, comprising three Grand Slam tournaments, Grand Prix Masters, Group B, comprising eleven tournaments, Group C and Group D.

1972 Grand Prix – Group A
The 1972 Grand Prix circuit was the third edition of the Grand Prix circuit and consisted of 33 tournaments which were held from February through November. The tournaments were graded in one of five categories which determined the number of ranking points available: Group AA, comprising three Grand Slam tournaments, Grand Prix Masters, Group A. Group B, Group C.

1973 Grand Prix – Group A
The 1973 Grand Prix circuit was the fourth edition of the Grand Prix circuit and consisted of 72 tournaments which were held from January through December. The tournaments were graded in one of five categories which determined the number of ranking points available: Group AA, comprising three Grand Slam tournaments, Grand Prix Masters, Group A, Group B, Group C. The Australian Open, although a Grand Slam event, was a Group A tournament on the 1973 Grand Prix circuit. In total there were 11 Group A tournaments.

1974 Grand Prix – Group AA 
The 1974 Grand Prix circuit was the fifth edition of the Grand Prix circuit and consisted of 49 tournaments which were held from December 73 through December 74. The tournaments were graded in one of six categories which determined the number of ranking points available: Group TC (Triple Crown), comprising three Grand Slam tournaments, Grand Prix Masters, Group AA. Group A, Group B and Group C. In total there were 12 Group AA tournaments.

1975 Grand Prix – Group AA
The 1975 Grand Prix circuit was the sixth edition of the Grand Prix circuit and consisted of 42 tournaments which were held from December 74 through December 75. The tournaments were graded in one of five categories which determined the number of ranking points available: Group TC (Triple Crown), comprising three Grand Slam tournaments, Grand Prix Masters, Group AA. Group A, and Group B.

1976 Grand Prix – 5 Star 
The 1976 Grand Prix circuit was the seventh edition of the Grand Prix circuit and consisted of 48 tournaments which were held from December 75 through December 76. The tournaments were graded in one of seven categories which determined the number of ranking points available: Group TC (Triple Crown), comprising three Grand Slam tournaments, Grand Prix Masters, Five Star, Four Star, Three Star, Two Star and One Star. There were four Five Star tournaments.

1977 Grand Prix – 6 Star
The 1977 Grand Prix circuit was the eighth edition of the Grand Prix circuit and consisted of 76 tournaments which were held from December 76 through December 77. The tournaments were graded in one of eight categories which determined the number of ranking points available: Grand Slam events, comprising four Grand Slam tournaments, Grand Prix Masters, Six Star. Five Star, Four Star, Three Star, Two Star and One Star. There were two Six Star tournaments.

1978 Grand Prix – Super Series
The 1978 Grand Prix circuit was the ninth edition of the Grand Prix circuit and consisted of 84 tournaments which were held from January through December. The tournaments were graded in three main categories: 1) Grand Slam events 2) Super Series tournaments with prize money of at least $175,000 and 3) tournaments with prize money between $50,000 and $175,000. Both latter categories were subdivided in four prize money categories which determined the number of ranking points available. In addition the season-ending Masters tournament carried prize money of $400,000. There were 32 Super Series tournaments, including 8 WCT tournaments.

1979 Grand Prix – Super Series
The 1979 Grand Prix circuit was the tenth edition of the Grand Prix circuit and consisted of 91 tournaments which were held from January through December. The tournaments were graded in one of twelve categories which determined the number of ranking points available: Grand Slam events, comprising four Grand Slam tournaments, Grand Prix Masters, Super Series.

1980 Grand Prix – Super Series
The 1980 Grand Prix circuit was the eleventh edition of the Grand Prix circuit and consisted of 83 tournaments which were held from January 80 through January 81. The tournaments were graded in one of twelve categories which determined the number of ranking points available: Grand Slam events, comprising four Grand Slam tournaments, Grand Prix Masters, Super Series, Regular Series.

1981 Grand Prix – Super Series
The 1981 Grand Prix circuit was the twelfth edition of the Grand Prix circuit and consisted of 89 tournaments which were held from January 1981 through January 1982. The tournaments were graded in one of twelve categories which determined the number of ranking points available: Grand Slam events, comprising four Grand Slam tournaments, Grand Prix Masters, Super Series, Regular Series. The Super Series consisted of 28 tournaments with prize money of at least $175,000 (excluding Grand Slams).

1982 Grand Prix – Super Series
The 1982 Grand Prix circuit was the thirteenth edition of the Grand Prix circuit and consisted of 70 tournaments which were held from January 82 through January 83. The tournaments were graded in one of twelve categories which determined the number of ranking points available: Grand Slam events, comprising four Grand Slam tournaments, Grand Prix Masters, Super Series, Regular Series. The Super Series consisted of 29 tournaments.

1983 Grand Prix – Super Series
The 1983 Grand Prix circuit was the fourteenth edition of the Grand Prix circuit and consisted of 70 tournaments which were held from January 83 through January 84. The tournaments were graded in one of twelve categories which determined the number of ranking points available: Grand Slam events, comprising four Grand Slam tournaments, Grand Prix Masters, Super Series, Regular Series.

1984 Grand Prix – Super Series
The 1984 Grand Prix circuit was the fifteenth edition of the Grand Prix circuit and consisted of 68 tournaments which were held from January 84 through January 85. The tournaments were graded in one of twelve categories which determined the number of ranking points available: Grand Slam events, comprising four Grand Slam tournaments, Grand Prix Masters, Super Series, Open Week Series and Regular Series.

1985 Grand Prix – Super Series
The 1985 Grand Prix circuit was the sixteenth edition of the Grand Prix circuit and consisted of 71 tournaments which were held from January 85 through January 86. The tournaments were graded in one of twelve categories which determined the number of ranking points available: Grand Slam events, comprising four Grand Slam tournaments, Grand Prix Masters, Super Series, Open Week Series and Regular Series. There were 32 Super Series tournaments.

1986 Grand Prix – Super Series
The 1986 Grand Prix circuit was the seventeenth edition of the Grand Prix circuit and consisted of 70 tournaments which were held from January through December. The tournaments were graded in one of twelve categories which determined the number of ranking points available: Grand Slam events, comprising four Grand Slam tournaments, Grand Prix Masters, Super Series, Open Week Series and Regular Series.

1987 Grand Prix – Super Series
The 1987 Grand Prix circuit was the eighteenth edition of the Grand Prix circuit and consisted of 77 tournaments which were held from December 87 through December 88. The tournaments were graded in one of twelve categories which determined the number of ranking points available: Grand Slam events, comprising four Grand Slam tournaments, Grand Prix Masters, Super Series, Open Week Series and Regular Series.

1988 Grand Prix – Super Series
The 1988 Grand Prix circuit was the nineteenth edition of the Grand Prix circuit and consisted of 77 tournaments which were held from January through December. The tournaments were graded in one of six categories which determined the number of ranking points available: Grand Slam events, comprising four Grand Slam tournaments, Olympic Games, Grand Prix Masters, Super Series, Open Week Series and Regular Series.

1989 Grand Prix – Super Series
The 1989 Grand Prix circuit was the nineteenth and final edition of the Grand Prix circuit and consisted of 73 tournaments which were held from January through December. The tournaments were graded in one of five categories which determined the number of ranking points available: Grand Slam events, comprising four Grand Slam tournaments, Grand Prix Masters, Super Series, Open Week Series and Regular Series. There were 30 Super Series tournaments.

Statistics

Singles

See also
 ATP Tour Masters 1000
 Grand Prix Circuit
 World Championship Tennis
 U.S. Pro Indoor
 WCT Tournament of Champions
 ATP Tour
 History of tennis

References
ATP Results Archive 1970–1989 Grand Prix Tour: accessed 17 May 2011.
ITF Results Archive 1970–1989 : accessed 17 May 2011.

Notes
Note: Some players who competed in these tournaments may have represented another country other than those stated by official sources the ATP and the ITF.

Further reading
 Bud Collins, History of Tennis: An Authoritative Encyclopedia and Record Book, New Chapter Press, US, 2nd Edition, 2010. .

+
ATP Tour Masters 1000